The discography of American rapper Memphis Bleek consists of four studio albums, twelve mixtapes, seventeen singles (including four as a featured artist) and fifteen music videos. An early signing to rapper Jay-Z's record label Roc-A-Fella Records, Bleek appeared on several of Jay-Z's early songs, and collaborated with him on the single "It's Alright" from the soundtrack to the film Streets Is Watching, which peaked at number 61 on the US Billboard Hot 100. Bleek went on to release his debut album, Coming of Age, in 1999, which contained the singles "Memphis Bleek Is...", "My Hood to Your Hood" and "What You Think of That".

After collaborating with Jay-Z on the singles "Hey Papi" and "Change the Game", Bleek's second album, The Understanding, was released on December 5, 2000. The album featured the single "Is That Your Chick (The Lost Verses)", a collaboration with Jay-Z and fellow rappers Missy Elliott and Twista, which achieved chart success in the United States, peaking at number 68 on the Billboard Hot 100, number 18 on the US Hot R&B/Hip-Hop Songs chart and number seven on the US Hot Rap Singles chart. The album also included the singles "My Mind Right" and "Do My...". Both Coming of Age and The Understanding were certified gold by the Recording Industry Association of America (RIAA).

Bleek released his third album, M.A.D.E., on December 16, 2003, which featured the singles "Round Here" and "Need Me In Your Life"; the former peaked at number 53 on the Hot R&B/Hip-Hop Songs chart. His fourth album, 534, peaked at number 11 on the Billboard 200, number three on the US Top R&B/Hip-Hop Albums and number one on the US Top Rap Albums chart following its release on May 17, 2005. 534 contained the singles "Like That" featuring Swizz Beatz, which peaked at number 47 on the Hot R&B/Hip-Hop Songs chart and number 22 on the Hot Rap Songs chart, and "Dear Summer".

Albums

Studio albums

Mixtapes

Singles

As lead artist

As featured artist

Other charted songs

Guest appearances

Music videos

As featured performer

Notes

A  "What You Think of That" did not enter the Hot R&B/Hip-Hop Songs chart, but peaked at number 9 on the Bubbling Under R&B/Hip-Hop Singles chart, which acts as a 25-song extension to the Hot R&B/Hip-Hop Songs chart.
B  "Like That" did not enter the Billboard Hot 100, but peaked at number 13 on the Bubbling Under Hot 100 Singles chart, which acts as a 25-song extension to the Hot 100.
C  "Dear Summer" did not enter the Billboard Hot 100, but peaked at number 16 on the Bubbling Under Hot 100 Singles chart, which acts as a 25-song extension to the Hot 100.
D  "Good Life" did not enter the Hot R&B/Hip-Hop Songs chart, but peaked at number 13 on the Bubbling Under R&B/Hip-Hop Singles chart, which acts as a 25-song extension to the Hot R&B/Hip-Hop Songs chart.
E  "Parking Lot Pimpin did not enter the Hot R&B/Hip-Hop Songs chart, but peaked at number 13 on the Bubbling Under R&B/Hip-Hop Singles chart, which acts as a 25-song extension to the Hot R&B/Hip-Hop Songs chart.

References

Hip hop discographies
Discographies of American artists